Katrakis may refer to one of the following:

 Manos Katrakis (1908–1984), Greek actor of theater and film
 Christina Katrakis (born 1980), American and European artist, art historian, modern art critic
 Vaso Katraki (1914–1988), Greek painter and printmaker
Greek-language surnames
Surnames